Copper Cliff North Mine is an underground nickel mine in Copper Cliff, Ontario, Canada.  It is owned and operated by Vale Canada Limited.

The mine was the 2007 winner of the John T. Ryan Trophy for metal mines.  Employing approximately 260 people, the mine went through 2006 without a lost-time-accident, producing of 4,200 tonnes of ore per day.

See also
Copper Cliff South Mine
List of nickel mines in Canada
List of mines in Ontario

References

Mines in Greater Sudbury
Nickel mines in Canada
Underground mines in Canada